Mahanta quadrilinea is a moth of the family Limacodidae. It is found in India and Bhutan.

References

Moths described in 1879
Limacodidae
Moths of Asia
Taxa named by Frederic Moore